The name Belarus can be literally as White Ruthenia or Baltic Ruthenia. In Balto-Slavic culture, white designates north; the name "White Rus'" originally referred to the northernmost settlements of the Kyivan Rus' by the shores of White Sea, which is a historical region of the medieval Novgorod Land. After the Novgorod Republic left the Rus' confederation, the north eastern lands of the modern Republic of Belarus became the northernmost ones and were called Ruthenia Alba in Latin. The name was used in western Europe for some time, along with ethnonyms Baltoruthenes, Baltorusins, White Ruthenes, and White Russians (not to be confused with the Russian White Army during the Russian Civil War). Belarusians trace their name back to the people of the Rus'.

The term Belarusians was promoted mostly during the 19th century by the Russian Empire as an ethnonym for Balto-Ruthenian  population instead of politonym Litvin which became prohibited after an annexation of the lands of Grand Duchy of Lithuania. For instance, this can be traced by editions of folklorist Ivan Sakharov, where in the edition of 1836, Belarusian customs are described as Litvin, while in the edition of 1886, the words Литва (Lithuania) and Литовцо-руссы (Lithuanian-Russians / Ruthenians) are replaced by respectively Белоруссия (Byelorussia) and белорусы (Byelorussians).

An ethno-religious theory suggests that the name used to describe the part of old Ruthenian lands within the Grand Duchy of Lithuania that had been populated mostly by Slavs who had been Christianized early, as opposed to Black Ruthenia, which was predominantly inhabited by pagan Balts.

An alternative explanation for the name comments on the white clothing worn by the local Slavic population. Another theory suggests that the old Rus' lands that were not conquered by the Tatars (i.e., Polotsk, Vitebsk and Mogilev) had been referred to as "White Rus. A fifth theory suggests that the color white was associated with the west, and Belarus was the western part of Rus in the 9th-13th centuries.

History
The name Rus is often conflated with its Latin forms Russia and Ruthenia, thus Belarus is often referred to as White Russia or White Ruthenia. The name first appeared in German and Latin medieval literature; the chronicles of Jan of Czarnków mention the imprisonment of Lithuanian grand duke Jogaila and his mother at "" in 1381. Before the Mongol invasions, the name White Rus' was used for the Duchy of Rostov-Suzdal (defining it as "free, great, enlightened," and Christianised), but later the name shifted to the Duchies of Vitebsk and Polotsk, until Polish geographer Jan of Stobnica expanded the meaning of the term to mean all the Rus' lands under the Grand Duchy of Lithuania. In some languages the country is often still referred to by a literal translation of "White Russia", including Dutch and Afrikaans (both ), and German. However, here too a gradual shift towards Belarus may be observed in some countries, such as the Netherlands, Germany and Denmark.

The Latin term "Alba Russia" was used again by Pope Pius VI in 1783 to recognize the Society of Jesus there, exclaiming "." The first known use of White Russia to refer to Belarus was in the late-16th century by Englishman Sir Jerome Horsey, who was known for his close contacts with the Russian Royal Court. During the 17th century, the Russian tsars used "White Rus" to describe the lands of the Grand Duchy of Lithuania.

The term Belorussia (the latter part similar but spelled and stressed differently from Росси́я, Russia) first rose in the days of the Russian Empire, and the Russian Tsar was usually styled "the Tsar of All the Russias", as Russia or the Russian Empire was formed by three parts of Russia—the Great, Little, and White. This asserted that the territories are all Russian and all the peoples are also Russian; in the case of the Belarusians, they were variants of the Russian people.

After the Bolshevik Revolution in 1917, the term "White Russia" caused some confusion, as it was also the name of the military force that opposed the red Bolsheviks. During the period of the Byelorussian SSR, the term Byelorussia was embraced as part of a national consciousness. In western Belarus under Polish control, Byelorussia became commonly used in the regions of Białystok and Grodno during the interwar period.

The term Byelorussia (its names in other languages such as English being based on the Russian form) was only used officially until 1991, when the Supreme Soviet of the Byelorussian SSR decreed by law that the new independent republic should be called Republic of Belarus ( spelled in Russian), and that its abridged form should be "Belarus". The law decreed that all the forms of the new term should be transliterated into other languages from their Belarusian language forms. The use of Byelorussian SSR and any abbreviations thereof were allowed from 1991 to 1993. Conservative forces in the newly independent Belarus did not support the name change and opposed its inclusion in the 1991 draft of the Constitution of Belarus.

Accordingly, the name Byelorussia was replaced by Belarus in English. Likewise, the adjective Belorussian or Byelorussian was replaced by Belarusan, which sounds like population's historical name of Ruthene, since independence and til 1995, when neo-soviet regime of Lukashenko restored soviet coat of arms, soviet flag and pushed for more Russia-like Belarusian adjective. Belarusian intelligentsia in the Stalin era attempted to change the name from Byelorussia to a form of Krivia because of the supposed connection with Russia. Some nationalists object to the name for the same reason. Several local newspapers kept the old name of the country in Russian in their names, for example , which is the localized publication of a popular Russian newspaper. Also, those who wish for Belarus to be reunited with Russia continue to use Belorussia. Officially, the full name of the country is "Republic of Belarus". In Russia, the usage of “Belorussia” still is very common. In Lithuanian, besides the name “Baltarusija” (White Russia), Belarus is also being called “Gudija”.

References

Bibliography

 
 
 
 
 
 
 
 
 

Belarus
History of Belarus